Michal Jonáš (born 25 September 1986, in Myjava) is a Slovak former football player who last time played for FC Slovan Liberec.

Career
He began career in Senica. Later he continued in Dubnica, which had experienced the highest Slovak football league. He debuted for MFK Dubnica as an 18-year-old in a match against Artmedia Petržalka and immediately scored. In February 2007, he joined Czech club FC Slovan Liberec on three a half-year contract. He played for Slovakia national football team. Coach Ján Kocian has nominated him for a friendly game 10 December 2006 against United Arab Emirates in Abu Dhabi. Slovakia won 2-1 and Jonáš scored the opening goal in match.

Car accident and early end of career
23 November 2007 had a serious car accident. Suffered many serious injuries. After a week it took over from an artificial sleep. Michal, who was 23 November 2007 a serious accident and has since appeared on the lawn for more than two years, knows that his career has finally ended up on the top level.

References

External links 
 Player´s profile at iDNES.cz 

1986 births
Living people
Slovak footballers
Slovak expatriate footballers
Slovakia under-21 international footballers
Association football defenders
Slovakia international footballers
FK Dubnica players
FC Slovan Liberec players
Czech First League players
Expatriate footballers in the Czech Republic
Slovak expatriate sportspeople in the Czech Republic
Slovak Super Liga players
People from Myjava
Sportspeople from the Trenčín Region